The A. B. Baca House, at 201 School of Mines Rd. in Socorro, New Mexico, was built in 1910.  It was listed on the National Register of Historic Places in 1991.

It is a "Hipped box", an example of Territorial Style.  It was built by Abel Trujillo and Jesus Martinez.

It was deemed notable as "a well-maintained, late-Territorial, hip-roofed, cubic adobe dwelling. It combines local craftsmanship with a plan, roof design, and decorative elements brought from the Midwest."

References

		
National Register of Historic Places in Socorro County, New Mexico
Houses completed in 1910